WCSH (channel 6) is a television station in Portland, Maine, United States, affiliated with NBC and owned by Tegna Inc. The station's studios are located on Congress Square in Downtown Portland, and its transmitter is located on Winn Mountain in Sebago. Together with WLBZ (channel 2) in Bangor, which simulcasts most of WCSH's local newscasts, it is known as News Center Maine.

WCSH is the oldest operating television station in Portland, signing on in December 1953. It was an outgrowth of WCSH radio, one of NBC's charter affiliates when it was constituted as a radio network in 1926, and broadcast from its namesake, the Congress Square Hotel in downtown Portland, for nearly 25 years. Founded by the Rines family and sold to Tegna predecessor Gannett Company in 1997, it has generally been the highest-rated station in TV news in the market since the mid-1980s.

History

Establishment
When the Federal Communications Commission (FCC) lifted its four-year freeze on television station applications in April 1952, four bids had already been received to start new stations in Portland, which was allocated two commercial very high frequency (VHF) channels and a third on the new ultra high frequency (UHF) band. One of these came from the Congress Square Hotel Company, owner of Portland radio station WCSH (970 AM), which had filed for channel 11 in 1948 but amended its application when only VHF channels 6 and 13 were assigned. In October 1952, the FCC ordered comparative hearings to decide who should be given construction permits for channels 6 and 13. Two groups sought each channel; Congress Square's application was rivaled by one from the Oliver Broadcasting Company, which owned station WPOR.

The third VHF channel in southern Maine was channel 8 at Poland Spring, and activity around this channel would proceed to unblock channel 6 in Portland. The FCC granted a permit in early July 1953 to Mount Washington Television, a group headed by former Maine governor Horace A. Hildreth containing principals from Oliver as shareholders. Oliver withdrew its application on July 30, 1953, and the FCC immediately awarded the hotel company a permit for channel 6, WCSH-TV. This was the second construction permit for a Portland TV station, with WPMT (channel 53) already being built. 

Because WCSH had conditionally purchased television equipment 18 months prior, it was assured delivery of equipment to put channel 6 on the air by the end of 1953. It announced its intention to be Portland's NBC affiliate, matching WCSH radio—which had carried NBC's very first program when the radio network began in November 1926 and previously had been part of the WEAF chain that preceded it. The transmitting facility would be erected in Falmouth, while WCSH's quarters in the Congress Square Hotel were extensively refitted to house the television station: a large radio studio was converted for television use, and a new studio was created out of a former storage room to house a kitchen for cooking shows.

The first test pattern was sent out on November 29, and on December 20, 1953, WCSH-TV began broadcasting. The station's broadcasting activity steadily increased in its early years, with such local shows as the home decorating program Your Home and You; Youth Cavalcade; the noontime women's program Living Down East; The Dave Astor Show, a teen dance program; and early and late evening newscasts. By January 1955, it was broadcasting 18 hours a day and had become a secondary affiliate of the DuMont Television Network in its final years of operation after WPMT closed the month before. The Rines family, which had founded WCSH radio and television and owned the Maine Broadcasting System with radio stations WRDO in Augusta and WLBZ in Bangor, expanded its TV holdings north in 1958 when it bought WTWO, an independent station in Bangor owned by Murray Carpenter, and made it into an NBC affiliate as WLBZ-TV.

After 50 years of radio and television operations in the Congress Square Hotel, WCSH opted to move its broadcasting businesses into more modern quarters. In 1977, WCSH moved one city block to occupy a four-story building at 1 Congress Square, which received a two-story addition containing studio space; WCSH radio moved to separate facilities in Scarborough. The Maine Broadcasting System continued to own the radio station until 1981, when it was sold and changed call letters; WLBZ radio in Bangor was also sold, while the television properties were retained. Particularly beginning in the 1980s, WCSH made its mark as the dominant station in Portland-market ratings, even if it sometimes irked NBC. The station was heavily protective of its 6 p.m. newscast, resulting in far more frequent pre-emptions of local sports events. In 1994, WCSH did not air 38 percent of NBC's 502 hours of sports programming that year—the most of any of NBC's 213 affiliates and more than double the pre-emption rate of WSMV-TV in Nashville, Tennessee—which the network begrudgingly tolerated because the station delivered strong performance for the network's daytime and prime time entertainment shows. Events as diverse as the second games of NBA doubleheaders and golf tournaments were not aired to provide a consistent airing of the 6 p.m. NewsCenter and to air movies which drew more viewers.

Gannett/Tegna ownership

The Rines-Thompson family exited the broadcasting industry after 72 years (44 of them owning WCSH) by selling WCSH and WLBZ to the Gannett Company in 1997. It had negotiated exclusively with Gannett for several months after approaching several potential acquirers. The family had decided to sell because of deregulation in broadcasting and costly new technological mandates, such as the forthcoming conversion to digital television. The transaction also marked the beginning of large national broadcast groups acquiring stations in Maine, a state traditionally dominated by local and family-owned TV station owners. 

WCSH's digital signal on UHF channel 44 signed on in April 2002. bringing high definition network television to the area. WCSH's broadcasts became digital-only, effective June 12, 2009; the station elected to continue broadcasting on channel 44 (using virtual channel 6), which it did until being repacked to channel 31 in 2020.

On June 29, 2015, the Gannett Company split in two, with one side specializing in print media and the other side specializing in broadcast and digital media. WCSH and WLBZ were retained by the latter company, named Tegna. The two stations adopted the brand News Center Maine in 2018 upon the rollout of a combined website for Portland and Bangor news coverage.

Local programming

News operation

Newscasts were part of WCSH's schedule from its first television broadcasts in 1953, and the station was airing early evening and late evening newscasts by 1955. While the station typically trailed WGAN-TV/WGME in the news ratings for most of its history, this changed in February 1986, when WCSH surpassed WGME at 11 p.m. and tied channel 13 in the vital 6 p.m. news slot. Later that year, the station would surpass WGME at 6 and proceed to do so for at least the next 16 years. This was aided by stability in its evening news team and NBC's strong national program lineup in the 1990s. On-air talent like Pat Callaghan, Cindy Williams, and meteorologist Joe Cupo remained on WCSH for years; Cupo left in 2016 after 37 years when Tegna offered voluntary retirement packages, while Williams retired in 2021 and Callaghan in 2022 after tenures of 32 and 43 years.

News production from Bangor was slowly scaled back beginning in the late 1980s. While WCSH's newscasts had already aired on WLBZ in the mornings and on weekends since 1989, regional 5:30 and 11 p.m. newscasts were instituted in 2000 with split weather forecasts for each area, with WLBZ only airing its own 5 and 6 p.m. newscasts. WLBZ ceased producing separate local newscasts altogether on October 8, 2015; all newscasts on both stations now come from the WCSH studios, though Bangor viewers continue to see separate weather forecasts. The presence of WLBZ in the News Center Maine operation has resulted in a newscast with a stronger statewide news focus than its competitors in the Portland market.

After The WB affiliate WPXT shut down its news department in fall 2002, WCSH and WLBZ entered into a news share agreement with that station, resulting in a nightly prime time newscast. The half-hour News Center at 10 moved to a digital subchannel of WCSH in 2008 when WPXT opted out of the arrangement, citing a lack of advertising support. In the early 2010s, WCSH tried its hand again at airing news for WPXT, with the addition of a 7 a.m. hour of WCSH's morning newscast branded as News Center Morning Report Xtra.

Non-news programming
From 2000 until the host's retirement in 2019, the News Center Maine stations aired human interest and outdoors program Bill Green's Maine; Green had gotten his start at WLBZ before moving to Portland and WCSH in 1981.

WCSH debuted 207, a weeknight lifestyle and entertainment magazine aired weeknights at 7 p.m., in 2003.

Subchannels
The station's digital signal is multiplexed:

References

External links
 

NBC network affiliates
True Crime Network affiliates
Court TV affiliates
Quest (American TV network) affiliates
Twist (TV network) affiliates
This TV affiliates
TheGrio affiliates
Tegna Inc.
Television channels and stations established in 1953
CSH
1953 establishments in Maine
Former Gannett subsidiaries